Jordanne Joyce Whiley MBE (born 11 June 1992) is a British retired wheelchair tennis player. Aged 14, she became Britain's youngest ever national women's singles champion in wheelchair tennis. She has osteogenesis imperfecta as does her father, Keith, who was also a Paralympian and won a bronze medal in 1984 in New York. As well as the 2015 US Open in wheelchair singles, Whiley has won 9 Grand Slam doubles titles, and she & Japanese Yui Kamiji are the fourth team in women's wheelchair doubles (as well as the most recent players) to complete the Calendar Year Grand Slam.
Whiley was appointed Member of the Order of the British Empire (MBE) in the 2015 Queens Birthday Honours list for services to wheelchair tennis.

Career

Junior
In 2006 at the age of 14 Whiley claimed her first senior main draw titles when she won the singles and doubles at the Cardiff Wheelchair Tennis tournament, also winning the girls title. At the end of 2006 Whiley had moved up from 112 to 48 in the rankings and had won junior titles in Poland and the Netherlands. Whiley won two awards at the British Wheelchair Tennis Association awards: Most improved female player and players' player of the year. Whiley created history in 2007 when she defeated Katharine Kruger in Tarbes. She became the first Briton to claim the Cruyff Foundation Wheelchair Juniors Masters title, Whiley also claimed the doubles title with Louise Hunt. Following on from the Masters success Whiley won her second senior title at the North West Challenge. Whiley followed this up by becoming the youngest national British Champion and winning the doubles title as well. Whiley then successfully defended her Cardiff wheelchair tennis tournament titles. In 2008 Whiley successfully defended her Masters titles; defeating Emmy Kaiser in the singles before partnering Hunt to back to back doubles titles. The following week Whiley claimed her first international title the Sion Indoor. Whiley then successfully defended both titles at the North West Challenge. She was named in the team for the 2008 Paralympic Games.

Senior
In 2012, she reached the finals of Women's wheelchair doubles at Wimbledon. She competed for Great Britain at the 2012 Summer Paralympics where she shared a bronze with Lucy Shuker in women's doubles. Whiley and Shuker won another bronze medal at the 2016 Summer Paralympics, where Whiley was eliminated in the women's singles quarterfinals.

Whiley and her partner Yui Kamiji of Japan achieved a calendar Grand Slam by winning the wheelchair doubles at the Australian Open (beating the Dutch pair Marjolein Buis and Jiske Griffioen), the French Open, Wimbledon and the US Open (overcoming Griffioen and fellow Dutchwoman Aniek van Koot in all three finals). They finished the year by adding the Masters crown after defeating Louise Hunt and Katharina Kruger in the final. However, despite the absence of van Koot and Griffioen the pair did not go undefeated throughout the tournament as they lost to Marjolein Buis and Michaela Spaanstra during the round robin group stage.

Whiley and Kamiji are four times doubles champions at Wimbledon, and Whiley was 11 weeks pregnant when they won their 4th title, in 2017. Whiley did not participate at the Championships in 2018, after giving birth to her son, earlier that year. She planned a comeback in late 2018. In the 2020 season, she won the Australian Open and US Open doubles titles.

In June 2021 she and Lucy Shuker were among six tennis players named to represent the UK at the postponed 2020 Paralympics in Tokyo. Shuker and Whiley won the silver medal in the women's doubles, with Whiley winning bronze in the women's singles.

Grand Slam performance timelines

Wheelchair singles

Wheelchair doubles

References

External links 

 
 
 

1992 births
Living people
British female tennis players
British wheelchair tennis players
Paralympic wheelchair tennis players of Great Britain
Paralympic medalists in wheelchair tennis
Paralympic bronze medalists for Great Britain
Wheelchair tennis players at the 2008 Summer Paralympics
Wheelchair tennis players at the 2012 Summer Paralympics
Wheelchair tennis players at the 2016 Summer Paralympics
Medalists at the 2012 Summer Paralympics
Medalists at the 2016 Summer Paralympics
Medalists at the 2020 Summer Paralympics
People with osteogenesis imperfecta
Sportspeople from Birmingham, West Midlands
Tennis people from the West Midlands (county)
21st-century British women